The Robert Trent Jones Golf Trail Championship was a golf tournament on the Korn Ferry Tour. It was played in April 2019 at The Senator Course of the Robert Trent Jones Golf Trail in Prattville,  Alabama. Lanto Griffin won the tournament, defeating Robby Shelton in a playoff. Both players would finish the Web.com Tour regular season inside the top 25 on the points list, thereby graduating to the PGA Tour.

Winners

References

External links
Coverage on the Web.com Tour's official site

Former Korn Ferry Tour events
Golf in Alabama
Recurring sporting events established in 2019
Recurring sporting events disestablished in 2019